Goluguvalasa is a village in Therlam mandal, Vizianagaram district, Andhra Pradesh, India.

Villages in Vizianagaram district